The Boeing–Saab T-7 Red Hawk, initially known as the Boeing T-X (later Boeing–Saab T-X), is an American/Swedish supersonic advanced jet trainer produced by Boeing in partnership with Saab. It was selected on 27 September 2018 by the United States Air Force (USAF) as the winner of the T-X program to replace the Northrop T-38 Talon as the service's advanced jet trainer.

Development
The USAF's Air Education and Training Command (AETC) began developing the requirements for a replacement for the supersonic Northrop T-38 Talon as early as 2003. Originally, the replacement trainer was expected to enter service around 2020. A fatigue failure of a T-38C killed the two-person crew in 2008 and the USAF advanced the target date of initial operational capability (IOC) to 2017. In the Fiscal 2013 budget proposal, the USAF suggested delaying the initial operating capability to FY2020 with the contract award not expected before FY2016. Shrinking budgets and higher priority modernization projects pushed the IOC of the T-X program winner to "fiscal year 2023 or 2024". Although the program was left out of the FY 2014 budget entirely, the service still viewed the trainer as a priority.

In cooperation with its Swedish aerospace partner, Saab, Boeing's submission to the competition was the Boeing T-X, a single-engine advanced jet trainer with a twin tail, tandem seating, and retractable tricycle landing gear. The submitted aircraft and demonstration models featured a General Electric F404 afterburning turbofan engine.

Boeing revealed its aircraft to the public on 13 September 2016. The first T-X aircraft flew on 20 December 2016.

On 27 September 2018, Boeing's design was officially announced as the USAF's new advanced jet trainer to replace the T-38 Talon. A total of 351 aircraft, 46 simulators, maintenance training and support are to be supplied at a program cost of up to US$9.2 billion. This contract has options for up to 475 airplanes in total. In 2018, Boeing recorded a $691-million pre-tax charge during the third quarter, in part because of the T-X program.

In May 2019, Saab announced that it would open a U.S. manufacturing facility for the T-X in Indiana in partnership with Purdue University.

On 16 September 2019, the USAF officially named the aircraft the "T-7A Red Hawk" as a tribute to the Tuskegee Airmen, who painted their airplanes' tails red. It also pays homage to the Curtiss P-40 Warhawk, one of the aircraft flown by the 99th Fighter Squadron, the U.S. Army Air Force's first black fighter squadron.

Boeing intends to offer an armed version of the T-7 as replacement for aging Northrop F-5 and Dassault/Dornier Alpha Jet fleets around the world.

The first production T-7 was rolled out on 28 April 2022 and will be delivered to the USAF.

Design 
The design officially entered series production in February 2021. In April 2021, Saab Group delivered one aft section of T-7A aircraft to the Boeing St. Louis plant. On 24 July 2021, Saab had delivered the second aft section to the Boeing St. Louis plant. Boeing will splice Saab's aft section with the front section, fins, wings and tail assembly to become a complete test aircraft for use in the EMD’s flight test program. On completion of the Engineering and Manufacturing Development (EMD) phase, Saab's brand new facility in West Lafayette, Indiana will serve as the manufacturing hub for the T-7A Red Hawk’s aft section and sub-systems such as hydraulics, fuel systems and secondary power. Saab has developed new software for the T-7 to help provide for cheaper and faster development. The T-7A employed digital engineering that went from development to the first test flight within 36 months. The T-7A has an advanced and digitized production line that takes only 30 minutes to splice the aft section with the wings. The digital build process allows technicians to build the aircraft with minimal tooling and drilling during the assembly process. 

The T-7's design allows for future missions to be added, such as the aggressor and light attack/fighter roles. In the training environment, it has been specifically designed for high-G and high angle-of-attack maneuvers and night operations, with an emphasis on being easily maintained. The aircraft is equipped with a single GE F404 turbofan engine, but produces three times the total thrust as the twinjet T-38.

Operational history

Potential operators 
Boeing aims to sell over 2,700 Red Hawks globally. In addition to the U.S. Air Force, the company is also targeting Serbia and Australia as potential international customers.

The Royal Australian Air Force (RAAF) is looking to replace 33 BAE Hawk Mk 127 Lead-in Fighter (LIF) jet trainers, which it first ordered in 1997. Boeing intends to participate in the tender of the RAAF’s LIFT program.

Serbia is looking at the T-7A Red Hawk as one possible replacement for its G-4s and J-22 trainer aircraft.

Moreover the F/T-7X, a variant of the T-7, is one of the contenders for the United States Air Force's Advanced Tactical Trainer program, with a possible 100 to 400 aircraft sale.

The T-7 is also one of the contenders for the United States Navy's Tactical Surrogate Aircraft program, with a possible sale of 64 aircraft.

Boeing has also pitched the T-7 to the Brazilian Air Force.

Variants
BTX-1
Two prototypes were constructed for evaluation:
 N381TX, the first prototype built and first T-7 to fly
 N382TX, the second prototype used in testing
T-7A Red Hawk
Production aircraft for the U.S. Air Force as the winner of the T-X program to replace the Northrop T-38 Talon.  Designated eT-7A prior to delivery, identifying it as a digitally engineered aircraft.
F/T-7X 
a variant T-7 proposed for the United States Air Force's Advanced Tactical Trainer program, with a possible 100 to 400 aircraft sale.

Operators

 United States Air Force

Specifications (T-7A)

See also

References

External links

 
 Saab T-7A page

2010s United States military trainer aircraft
Single-engined jet aircraft
Mid-wing aircraft
Aircraft first flown in 2016
T-7